Fully Unleashed: The Live Gigs is a limited edition double-CD compilation of live material by the American rock supergroup Cactus collected and released by Rhino Handmade in 2004. The compilation includes the original lineup's final show performed in Memphis, Tennessee on December 19, 1971 in its entirety. It also includes tracks performed at the August 28, 1970 Isle of Wight Festival, a June 26, 1971 show at the Gilligan's club in Buffalo, New York, and four tracks from the later 1972 lineup performing at Mar y Sol Pop Festival in Puerto Rico on April 3, 1972. Only 5000 copies of the compilation were made.

Track listing

 Disc 1, Tracks 1-8 and Disc 2, Tracks 1-2 recorded 12/19/1971 at the Ellis Auditorium in Memphis, TN
 Disc 2, Tracks 3-4 recorded 8/28/1970 at the Isle of Wight Festival in East Afton Farm, Isle of Wight, England
 Disc 2, Tracks 5-6 recorded 8/27/1971 at the Gilligan's club in Buffalo, NY
 Disc 2, Tracks 7-10 recorded 4/3/1972 at the Mar y Sol Pop Festival in Puerto Rico

Personnel
 Carmine Appice – drums, percussion, background vocals
 Tim Bogert – bass, background vocals
 Rusty Day – lead vocals
 Jim McCarty – guitar
 Ron Leejack – guitar (Disc 2, Tracks 5-6)
 Werner Fritzsching – guitar (Disc 2, Tracks 7-10)
 Duane Hitchings – organ, piano, electric piano (Disc 2, Tracks 7-10)
 Peter French – lead vocals (Disc 2, Tracks 7-10)

References

External links
 rhinohandmade.com

Cactus (American band) live albums
2004 live albums
Rhino Handmade live albums